John Ekman (15 November 1880 – 22 November 1949) was a Swedish film actor.

Biography
He first trained as an artist under Richard Bergh (1858-1919). He was employed by various theater companies; Swedish Biograft Theater in Kristianstad (1911 to 1917),  Lorensbergsteatern in Gothenburg (1918–1923)  and Helsingborgs stadsteater in Helsingborg (1923–1928) and from 1928 again at Lorensbergsteatern.  He also appeared in 81 films between 1912 and 1949.

Selected filmography

 A Ruined Life (1912)
 The Gardener (1912)
 The Voice of Passion (1913)
 Half Breed (1913)
 The Miracle (1913)
 Judge Not (1914)
 The Strike (1914)
 Children of the Streets (1914)
 Daughter of the Peaks (1914)
 Hearts That Meet (1914)
 Guilt Redeemed (1915)
 The Price of Betrayal (1915)
 The Sea Vultures (1916)
 The Outlaw and His Wife (1918)
 The Phantom Carriage (1921)
 The Suitor from the Highway (1923)
 Johan Ulfstjerna (1923)
 Ingmar's Inheritance (1925)
 Kalle Utter (1925)
 Sin (1928)
 Black Rudolf (1928)
 Hotel Paradis (1931)
 Man's Way with Women (1934)
 The Atlantic Adventure (1934)
 Synnöve Solbakken (1934)
 Baldwin's Wedding (1938)
 The People of Högbogården (1939)
 The Fight Continues (1941)
 Lasse-Maja (1941)
 General von Döbeln (1942)
 Count Only the Happy Moments (1944)
 Black Roses (1945)
 The Serious Game (1945)
 The Rose of Tistelön (1945)
 Each Heart Has Its Own Story (1948)
 Carnival Evening (1948)
 Big Lasse of Delsbo (1949)
 Love Wins Out (1949)
 To Joy (1950)

References

External links

1880 births
1949 deaths
Swedish male film actors
Swedish male silent film actors
Male actors from Stockholm
20th-century Swedish male actors